Nebraska is the sixth studio album by American singer-songwriter Bruce Springsteen, released on September 30, 1982, by Columbia Records. Springsteen recorded the songs as demos on a 4-track recorder, intending to rerecord them with the E Street Band, but decided to release them as they were. Nebraska remains one of the most highly regarded albums in his catalogue.

The songs on Nebraska deal with ordinary, down-on-their-luck blue-collar characters who face a challenge or a turning point in their lives. The songs also address the subject of outsiders, criminals and mass murderers with little hope for the future—or no future at all—as in the title track, where the main character is sentenced to death in the electric chair. Unlike previous albums, which often exude energy, youth, optimism and joy, the vocal tones of Nebraska are solemn and thoughtful, with fleeting moments of grace and redemption woven through the lyrics. The album's reverb-laden vocals and mood combined with dark lyrical content have been described by music critic William Ruhlmann as "one of the most challenging albums ever released by a major star on a major record label". Because of the album's somber content, Springsteen chose not to tour in support of the album, making it Springsteen's first major release that was not supported by a tour, and his only such release until 2019's Western Stars.

Background

Initially, Springsteen recorded demos for the album at his home with a 4-track cassette recorder. The demos were sparse, using only acoustic guitar, electric guitar (on "Open All Night"), harmonica, mandolin, glockenspiel, tambourine, organ, synthesizer (on "My Father's House") and Springsteen's voice. The songs also have sparse composition, and many are simple three-chord songs. After he completed work on the demos, Springsteen brought the songs to the studio and worked with the E Street Band in April 1982 on rock versions; these sessions are commonly referred to as "the Electric Nebraska Sessions". Only Springsteen and Jon Landau had any decision-making power in this process. They felt certain songs were too personal, and the raw, haunting folk essence present on the home tapes could not be duplicated or equaled in the band treatments; the tracks about which they felt this way made up the album Nebraska. However, eight of the 12 tracks that went on the 1984 album Born in the U.S.A. were composed of "Electric Nebraska" success stories. They were led by "Born in the U.S.A.", which was completed on May 3, 1982; "Downbound Train", recorded April 28, 1982; "Cover Me", recorded at The Hit Factory, New York on January 25, 1982; "I'm On Fire", recorded at The Power Station on May 11, 1982; "Glory Days", recorded at The Power Station on May 5, 1982; "Darlington County", recorded at The Power Station on May 13, 1982; "Working on the Highway", recorded April 30 and May 6, 1982, and "I'm Going Down", recorded on May 12 or 13, 1982.

The demo recording sessions that produced the album actually covered several days, but January 3, 1982, is credited as the "legendary night" when 15 tracks were recorded. They were "Starkweather" ("Nebraska"), "Atlantic City", "Mansion on the Hill", "Johnny 99", "Highway Patrolman", "State Trooper", "Used Cars", "Wanda" ("Open All Night"), "Reason to Believe", "Born in the U.S.A.", "Downbound Train", "Child Bride", "Losin' Kind", "My Father's House" (May 25, 1982), and "Pink Cadillac", a total of 15 songs; 10 ended up on Nebraska and the demo for "Born in the U.S.A." would appear later on the Tracks compilation. The remaining four unreleased demos circulate among Springsteen fans. Two of these, "Downbound Train" (Born in the U.S.A.) and "Pink Cadillac" (Tracks), were officially released in band format, leaving "Child Bride" and "Losin' Kind" as truly unreleased. There was another demo, "The Big Payback" recorded later in spring 1982, and "Johnny Bye-Bye", which Springsteen confused with a live version recorded July 1981, that was actually never recorded during this period, that brings the total to the often-cited 17.

In an interview with Rolling Stone, Springsteen said, "I was just doing songs for the next rock album, and I decided that what always took me so long in the studio was the writing. I would get in there, and I just wouldn't have the material written, or it wasn't written well enough, and so I'd record for a month, get a couple of things, go home write some more, record for another month—it wasn't very efficient. So this time, I got a little Teac four-track cassette machine, and I said, I'm gonna record these songs, and if they sound good with just me doin' 'em, then I'll teach 'em to the band. I could sing and play the guitar, and then I had two tracks to do somethin' else, like overdub a guitar or add a harmony. It was just gonna be a demo. Then I had a little Echoplex that I mixed through, and that was it. And that was the tape that became the record. It's amazing that it got there, 'cause I was carryin' that cassette around with me in my pocket without a case for a couple of weeks, just draggin' it around. Finally, we realized, 'Uh-oh, that's the album.' Technically, it was difficult to get it on a disc. The stuff was recorded so strangely, the needle would read a lot of distortion and wouldn't track in the wax. We almost had to release it as a cassette." Another problem arose during mastering of the tapes because of low recording volume, but that was resolved with sophisticated noise reduction techniques.

Springsteen fans have long speculated whether the full-band recordings of the Nebraska session tracks, nicknamed Electric Nebraska, that took place in the last week of April 1982, will ever surface. Of the theoretical 17 tracks, 5 were not recorded with the band ("Losin' Kind", "Child Bride", "The Big Payback", "State Trooper" and "My Father's House"), and "Born in the U.S.A.", "Downbound Train" and "Pink Cadillac" have been released, leaving nine in the vaults. In a 2006 interview, manager Jon Landau said that the release of the remaining tracks is unlikely, and that "the right version of Nebraska came out".  But in a 2010 interview with Rolling Stone, E Street Band drummer Max Weinberg praised the full band recording of the album as "killing".

Themes
The album begins with "Nebraska", a first-person narrative based on the true story of 19-year-old spree killer Charles Starkweather and his 14-year-old girlfriend, Caril Ann Fugate, and ends with "Reason to Believe", a complex narrative that offers a small amount of hope to counterbalance the otherwise dark nature of the album. The remaining songs are largely of the same bleak tone, including the dark "State Trooper", influenced by the vocal stylings of Alan Vega and Suicide's "Frankie Teardrop". Criminal behavior continues as a theme in the song "Highway Patrolman": even though the protagonist works for the law, he lets his brother escape after he has shot someone. "Open All Night", a Chuck Berry-style lone guitar rave-up, does manage a dose of defiant, humming-towards-the-gallows exuberance.

Springsteen stated that the stories in this album were partly inspired by historian Howard Zinn's book A People's History of the United States. A music video was produced for the song "Atlantic City"; it features stark, black-and-white images of the city, which had not yet undergone its later economic transformation.

Critical reception

In the Village Voice's annual Pazz & Jop critics poll, Nebraska was voted the third best album of 1982. In 1989, it was ranked 43rd on Rolling Stone magazine's list of the 100 greatest albums of the 1980s. That same year, Richard Williams wrote in Q magazine that "Nebraska would simply have been a vastly better record with the benefit of the E Street Band and a few months in the studio."

In 2003, Nebraska was ranked number 224 on Rolling Stones list of the 500 greatest albums of all time, and 226 in a 2012 revised list, and 150 in a 2020 reboot of the list. Pitchfork listed it as the 60th greatest album of the 1980s. In 2006, Q placed the album at number 13 in its list of "40 Best Albums of the '80s".  In 2012, Slant Magazine listed the album at number 57 on its list of "Best Albums of the 1980s".  The album was also included in the book 1001 Albums You Must Hear Before You Die.

Legacy

Covers
Being a highly influential album, the songs of Nebraska have been covered numerous times. Notably, country music icon Johnny Cash's 1983 album Johnny 99 featured versions of two of Springsteen's songs from Nebraska: "Johnny 99" and "Highway Patrolman". Cash also contributed to a widely praised tribute album, Badlands: A Tribute to Bruce Springsteen's Nebraska, which was released on the Sub Pop label in 2000 and produced by Jim Sampas. It featured covers of the Nebraska songs recorded in the stripped-down spirit of the original recordings by a wide-ranging group of artists including Hank Williams III, Los Lobos, Dar Williams, Deana Carter, Ani DiFranco, Son Volt, Ben Harper, Aimee Mann, and Michael Penn. Three additional tracks covered other Springsteen songs in the same vein: Johnny Cash's contribution was "I'm on Fire", a track from Springsteen's best-selling album Born in the U.S.A..

Kelly Clarkson compared her effort to move away from mainstream to edgier and more personal music on her third studio album My December to Springsteen's Nebraska.

On December 7, 2022, singer-songwriter Ryan Adams released a full track-by-track cover of the album.

The Indian Runner
The song "Highway Patrolman" would provide the inspiration for the motion picture The Indian Runner released in 1991. The film follows the same plot outline as the song, telling the story of a troubled relationship between two brothers; one is a deputy sheriff, the other is a criminal. The Indian Runner was written and directed by Sean Penn, and starred David Morse and Viggo Mortensen.

Deliver Me from Nowhere
The short stories in Deliver Me from Nowhere, a book written by Tennessee Jones published in 2005, were inspired by the themes of Nebraska. The book takes its title from a line in "Open All Night" (the line is also the last in "State Trooper").

Pressure Machine
The Killers frequently cited Nebraska as an influence for their 2021 album Pressure Machine. Brandon Flowers in an interview would describe recording the track "Terrible Thing" on a Tascam microphone as a direct nod to the album's recording process.

Track listing

Personnel
Bruce Springsteen – vocals, guitar, harmonica, mandolin, glockenspiel, tambourine, Hammond organ, synthesizer, production
Mike Batlan – recording engineer
David Michael Kennedy – photography copyrighted 1975
Dennis King – mastering
Bob Ludwig, Steve Marcussen – mastering consultants
Andrea Klein – design

Charts

Weekly charts

Year-end charts

Certifications

References

External links
 
Album lyrics and audio samples

1982 albums
Bruce Springsteen albums
Columbia Records albums
Demo albums
Albums recorded in a home studio